Happy 7 may refer to:

 Happy Seven, anime series
 Happy 7, Hello! Project shuffle units